The R366 is a Regional Route in South Africa that connects Elands Bay in the north-west with the R365, and indirectly, Piketberg and the N7.

Route
Starting in Elands Bay it runs south-east along the north bank of the Verlorenvlei River. After 28 kilometres, it passes Redelinghuys on the right. After a further 21 kilometres, it crosses the Kruismans River. It then veers east to end at a t-junction with the R365 after five kilometres. If you continue straight at the t-junction, you veer South towards Piketberg on R365. The turn-off north also continues as the R365, heading north-north-west to Leipoldtville and Lamberts Bay.

External links
 Routes Travel Info

References

Regional Routes in the Western Cape